Zemfira.Live is a Zemfira's first live album, released on October 16, 2006. The album was recorded during the tour in support of the album Vendetta. It has been sold in 150,000 copies.

Track listing
"Самолёт"                      (Airplane)
"Любовь как случайная смерть"  (Love as accidental death)
"Блюз"                         (Blues)
"Повесица"                     (Hang myself)
"Ариведерчи"                   (Arrivederci)
"Дай мне Руку (Я Пожму её)"    (Give Me Your Hand (I'll Shake it))
"Прости Меня Моя Любовь"       (Forgive Me My Love)
"Главное"                      (The Main Thing)
"Мечтой"                       (Dream) 
"Бесконечность"                (Infinity)

References

Zemfira albums
2006 live albums